The 2022–23 Cairns Taipans season was the 24th season of the franchise in the National Basketball League (NBL).

Roster

Standings

Ladder 

The NBL tie-breaker system as outlined in the NBL Rules and Regulations states that in the case of an identical win–loss record, the overall points percentage will determine order of seeding.

Ladder progression

Game log

NBL Blitz 

|-style="background:#FFBBBB;"
| 1
| 17 September
| @ Perth
| L 98–80
| Keanu Pinder (21)
| Tahjere McCall (8)
| Tahjere McCall (6)
| Darwin Basketball Facility916
| 0–1
|-style="background:#FFBBBB;"
| 2
| 20 September
| Brisbane
| L 76–77
| Bul Kuol (21)
| Joshua Davey (8)
| Tahjere McCall (4)
| Darwin Basketball Facility660
| 0–2
|-style="background:#FFBBBB;"
| 3
| 22 September
| @ Tasmania
| L 100–81
| Ben Ayre (26)
| Joshua Davey (7)
| Ayre, Davey, Đerić, Scott (2)
| Darwin Basketball Facility912
| 0–3

Regular season 

|-style="background:#BBF3BB;"
| 1
| 3 October
| @ Tasmania
| W 84–106
| Majok Deng (26)
| Tahjere McCall (7)
| Tahjere McCall (7)
| MyState Bank Arena4,231
| 1–0
|-style="background:#BBF3BB;"
| 2
| 8 October
| @ S.E. Melbourne
| W 76–85
| Keanu Pinder (19)
| Hogg, Pinder (8)
| Shannon Scott (7)
| John Cain Arena4,953
| 2–0
|-style="background:#FFBBBB;"
| 3
| 10 October
| Perth
| L 76–105
| Keanu Pinder (18)
| Keanu Pinder (15)
| Shannon Scott (8)
| Cairns Convention Centre3,608
| 2–1
|-style="background:#BBF3BB;"
| 4
| 14 October
| @ Sydney
| W 78–83
| Pinder, Scott (16)
| Keanu Pinder (11)
| Hogg, Scott (5)
| Qudos Bank Arena7,287
| 3–1
|-style="background:#BBF3BB;"
| 5
| 20 October
| @ Melbourne
| W 77–81
| Keanu Pinder (26)
| Keanu Pinder (10)
| Shannon Scott (9)
| John Cain Arena4,449
| 4–1
|-style="background:#FFBBBB;"
| 6
| 23 October
| New Zealand
| L 64–68
| D. J. Hogg (25)
| Keanu Pinder (12)
| Shannon Scott (8)
| Cairns Convention Centre4,091
| 4–2
|-style="background:#FFBBBB;"
| 7
| 29 October
| @ Sydney
| L 106–103
| D. J. Hogg (27)
| Keanu Pinder (7)
| Shannon Scott (8)
| Qudos Bank Arena7,282
| 4–3

|-style="background:#BBF3BB;"
| 8
| 4 November 
| Melbourne
| W 97–72
| Kuol, Pinder (18)
| Keanu Pinder (11)
| Shannon Scott (6)
| Cairns Convention Centre3,704
| 5–3
|-style="background:#BBF3BB;"
| 9
| 19 November
| @ Brisbane
| W 82–90
| Keanu Pinder (25)
| Hogg, Pinder (8)
| Shannon Scott (10)
| Nissan Arena4,401
| 6–3
|-style="background:#FFBBBB;"
| 10
| 25 November 
| New Zealand
| L 71–82
| Sam Waardenburg (15)
| Keanu Pinder (10)
| Shannon Scott (7)
| Cairns Convention Centre3,661
| 6–4
|-style="background:#BBF3BB;"
| 11
| 28 November 
| Sydney
| W 94–88 (OT)
| Keanu Pinder (30)
| Keanu Pinder (13)
| Tahjere McCall (4)
| Cairns Convention Centre3,636
| 7–4

|-style="background:#FFBBBB;"
| 12
| 2 December 
| @ Adelaide
| L 78–75
| Tahjere McCall (24)
| Keanu Pinder (8)
| Shannon Scott (6)
| Adelaide Entertainment Centre7,198
| 7–5
|-style="background:#BBF3BB;"
| 13
| 10 December 
| Illawarra
| W 102–101 (2OT)
| Hogg, McCall (23)
| Keanu Pinder (14)
| Pinder, Scott (6)
| Cairns Convention Centre3,607
| 8–5
|-style="background:#BBF3BB;"
| 14
| 14 December 
| Brisbane 
| W 85–76
| Bul Kuol (23)
| Keanu Pinder (15)
| Tahjere McCall (7)
| Cairns Convention Centre3,497
| 9–5
|-style="background:#BBF3BB;"
| 15
| 17 December 
| @ Tasmania
| W 82–91
| Keanu Pinder (34)
| Hogg, Pinder (7)
| Shannon Scott (6)
| MyState Bank Arena4,231
| 10–5
|-style="background:#FFBBBB;"
| 16
| 20 December 
| Perth
| L 83–105
| D. J. Hogg (24)
| Tahjere McCall (10)
| Tahjere McCall (4)
| Cairns Convention Centre3,752
| 10–6
|-style="background:#FFBBBB;"
| 17
| 23 December 
| @ Melbourne 
| L 84–81
| Tahjere McCall (21)
| Keanu Pinder (8)
| Tahjere McCall (4)
| John Cain Arena10,175
| 10–7
|-style="background:#BBF3BB;"
| 18
| 31 December 
| Adelaide
| W 86–83
| Shannon Scott (31)
| Joshua Davey (5)
| Tahjere McCall (5)
| Cairns Convention Centre4,851
| 11–7

|-style="background:#BBF3BB;"
| 19
| 2 January 
| @ Illawarra 
| W 89–96
| Shannon Scott (18)
| Sam Waardenburg (9)
| McCall, Scott (6)
| WIN Entertainment Centre2,718
| 12–7
|-style="background:#BBF3BB;"
| 20
| 5 January 
| @ Brisbane
| W 81–107
| Sam Waardenburg (24)
| Sam Waardenburg (8)
| Kuol, McCall (6)
| Nissan Arena4,258
| 13–7
|-style="background:#BBF3BB;"
| 21
| 8 January
| S.E. Melbourne
| W 94–85
| Tahjere McCall (24)
| Sam Waardenburg (7)
| Hogg, Scott (7)
| Cairns Convention Centre4,457
| 14–7
|-style="background:#BBF3BB;"
| 22
| 13 January 
| Illawarra 
| W 89–84
| Tahjere McCall (24)
| Tahjere McCall (11)
| Shannon Scott (6)
| Cairns Convention Centre4,063
| 15–7
|-style="background:#BBF3BB;"
| 23
| 15 January 
| @ New Zealand
| W 83–85
| Hogg, Kuol, McCall (18)
| Sam Waardenburg (10)
| Ayre, Scott (3)
| Spark Arena7,194
| 16–7
|-style="background:#FFBBBB;"
| 24
| 20 January 
| Tasmania
| L 77–85
| Hogg, Kuol (17)
| Bul Kuol (8)
| Shannon Scott (6)
| Cairns Convention Centre4,705
| 16–8
|-style="background:#FFBBBB;"
| 25
| 25 January 
| @ S.E. Melbourne 
| L 85–80
| D. J. Hogg (24)
| Sam Waardenburg (10)
| Sam Waardenburg (4)
| State Basketball Centre3,300
| 16–9
|-style="background:#BBF3BB;"
| 26
| 28 January 
| Brisbane
| W 94–87
| Hogg, Kuol, McCall (23)
| Sam Waardenburg (10)
| D. J. Hogg (6)
| Cairns Convention Centre4,437
| 17–9
|-style="background:#FFBBBB;"
| 27
| 30 January 
| Adelaide
| L 96–99
| Hogg, Waardenburg (26)
| Tahjere McCall (10)
| Tahjere McCall (7)
| Cairns Convention Centre3,530
| 17–10

|-style="background:#BBF3BB;"
| 28
| 3 February 
| @ Perth
| W 71–84
| Bul Kuol (15)
| Majok Deng (11)
| Shannon Scott (4)
| RAC Arena11,668
| 18–10

Postseason 

|-style="background:#FFBBBB;"
| 1
| 9 February 
| Tasmania
| L 79–87
| Tahjere McCall (24)
| D. J. Hogg (8)
| D. J. Hogg (4)
| Cairns Convention Centre3,670
| 0–1

|-style="background:#BBF3BB;"
| 2
| 12 February 
| Perth
| W 91–78
| D. J. Hogg (32)
| Sam Waardenburg (10)
| Shannon Scott (8)
| Cairns Convention Centre3,020
| 1–1

|-style="background:#FFBBBB;"
| 3
| 15 February
| @ Sydney
| L 95–87
| D. J. Hogg (24)
| Sam Waardenburg (7)
| Shannon Scott (7)
| Qudos Bank Arena7,367
| 1–2
|-style="background:#BBF3BB;"
| 4
| 17 February
| Sydney
| W 93–82
| D. J. Hogg (25)
| Sam Waardenburg (10)
| Tahjere McCall (7)
| Cairns Convention Centre4,626
| 2–2
|-style="background:#FFBBBB;"
| 5
| 19 February 
| @ Sydney
| L 79–64
| Ben Ayre (20)
| Sam Waardenburg (12)
| Ben Ayre (4)
| Qudos Bank Arena7,123
| 2–3

Transactions

Re-signed

Additions

Subtractions

Awards

Club awards 
 Club MVP: D. J. Hogg
 Defensive Player: Tahjere McCall
 Players’ Player: Shannon Scott
 Commitment to Community: Adam Forde
 Members’ Choice MVP: D. J. Hogg
 Coaches Award: Ben Ayre

See also
2022–23 NBL season

References

External links
 Official Website

Cairns Taipans season
Cairns Taipans season
Cairns Taipans seasons
Cairns Taipans